The Gentle Shepherd is a pastoral comedy by Allan Ramsay. It was first published in 1725 and dedicated to Susanna Montgomery, Lady Eglinton, to whom Ramsay gifted the original manuscript.

The play has some happy descriptive scenes and is a pleasant delineation of rustic manners in the countryside of the Scottish Lowlands in the 18th century. The backdrop is believed to have been inspired by the Penicuik area some eight miles south west of Edinburgh where Ramsay was frequently the guest of his patron Sir John Clerk of Penicuik at Penicuik House.

First Scottish opera
The Italian style of classical music was probably first brought to Scotland by the Italian cellist and composer Lorenzo Bocchi, who travelled to Scotland in the 1720s, introducing the cello to the country and then developing settings for lowland Scots songs. He possibly had a hand in the first Scottish opera, the pastoral The Gentle Shepherd, with libretto by the makar Allan Ramsay.

References

External links
 Text of poem

1725 poems
Scottish plays
Plays set in Scotland
Operas set in Scotland
Scottish poems
1725 in Scotland
Comedy plays
Scottish comedy